

Ediacara  is a locality in the Australian state of South Australia located about  north of the state capital of Adelaide and about  to the south west of the town of Leigh Creek.

The locality was established on 26 April 2013 in respect to "the long established local name".  Its name is derived from the use of "Ediacara" in the names of features such as Ediacara Range.   

Ediacara is located within the federal Division of Grey, the state electoral district of Stuart, the Pastoral Unincorporated Area of South Australia, and the state’s Far North region.

See also
List of cities and towns in South Australia

References

Towns in South Australia
Places in the unincorporated areas of South Australia
Far North (South Australia)